The Bangladesh Air Force (BAF) is the aerial warfare branch of the Bangladesh Armed Forces. The Air Force is primarily responsible for air defence of Bangladesh's sovereign territory as well as providing air support to the Bangladesh Army and Bangladesh Navy. Furthermore, the BAF has a territorial role in providing tactical and strategic air transport and logistics capability for the country.

Since its establishment on 28 September 1971, the Air Force has been involved in various combat and humanitarian operations, from the Bangladesh Liberation War in which it was born, to supporting international efforts including United Nations peacekeeping missions. Operation Kilo Flight was a famous operation conducted by the Bangladesh Air Force during the Bangladesh Liberation War.

History

Foundation

The Bangladesh Air Force was officially formed on 28 September 1971 consisting of the revolting Bengali officers and airmen of the Pakistan Air Force at Dimapur Airport in the Indian state of Nagaland and it was launched formally by flying three repaired vintage aircraft on 8 October 1971. BAF's initial personnel were around a 1000 Bengali members of the Pakistan Air Force who were stationed in East Pakistan at the outbreak of the war and who deserted to the Bangladeshi side. At that time, the embryo of Bangladesh Air Force BAF was formed with less than a hundred officers and around 900 airmen and warrant officers. These numbers were gradually strengthened by the slow but steady defection from among the around 3000 Bengali officers and airmen stationed and grounded in West Pakistan. By the first week of December a total of 700 Bengali officers and airmen had defected from the Western border.  A significant number of BAF personnel participated in the Ground Warfare roles in the Bangladesh War of Independence. During the independence war, initially, officers of the BAF attached to the then Bangladesh Government were Chief Representative to Chakulia Guerrilla Training Camp Squadron Leader M. Hamidullah Khan, Group Captain A. K. Khandekar, DCOS Army(Liaison) later Sub-Sector Commander and as Commander - Sector 11, Flight Lieutenant Liaqat as Battalion Adjutant, Flying Officer Rouf, Flying Officer Ashraf and Flight Sergeant Shafiqullah as company commanders. Squadron Leader Sadruddin Hossain, Squadron Leader Wahidur Rahim, Squadron Leader Nurul Qader, Squadron Leader Shamsur Rahman and Squadron Leader Ataur Rahman as sub sector company commanders. Squadron Leader Khademul Bashar participated in the war as Commander-Sector 6.

Indian civilian authorities and the IAF donated 1 DC-3 Dakota (gifted by the Maharaja of Jodhpor), 1 Twin Otter plane, and 1 Alouette III helicopter for the newborn Bangladesh Air Force. The Bengali rank and file fixed up the World War II vintage runway at Dimapur Airport, then began rigging the aircraft for combat duty. The Dakota was modified to carry 500 pound bombs, but for technical reasons it was only used to ferry Bangladesh government personnel. The Alouette III helicopter was rigged to fire 14 rockets from pylons attached to its side and had .303 Browning machine guns installed, in addition to having 1-inch (25 mm) steel plate welded to its floor for extra protection. The Twin Otter boasted 7 rockets under each of its wings and could deliver ten 25 pound bombs, which were rolled out of the aircraft by hand through a makeshift door. This tiny force was dubbed Kilo Flight, the first fighting formation of the nascent Bangladesh Air force. Squadron Leader Sultan Mahmud was appointed as the commander of the 'Kilo Flight'.

Bangladesh Air Force first went in action on 3 December 1971 and attacked the Chattogram-based Oil tank depot and oil tank depot was totally destroyed by that air attack. The Air attack was conducted by Capt. Akram Ahmed. The second Bangladesh Air Force attack was on 6 December 1971 at Moulvibazar Pakistani Army barracks under the command of Squadron Leader Sultan Mahmud, where Captain Shahabuddin Ahmed was co-pilot.

After the surrender of Pakistan, all personnel reported to Bangladesh Forces commander-in-chief, Col. M. A. G. Osmani. On 7 April 1972, the post of the chief of air staff went into effect by order of the President of Bangladesh. The combined command of Bangladesh Forces had been abolished with effect from 7 April 1972 and replaced by three separate commands for the three services with acting chiefs of staff. The Bangladesh air force gradually began to reoccupy the reform all the airbase structures throughout the country, HQ administrative buildings, fuel and weapons depots.

After independence
 
After independence, in November–December 1972 the BAF received a significant donation from the former USSR. Among the aircraft delivered were ten single-seat Mikoyan-Gurevich MiG-21MFs, two twin-seat Mikoyan-Gurevich MiG-21UMs, and twelve Mil Mi-8 utility helicopters. Later China also supplied some equipment.

Apart from the aircraft of Kilo Flight which were donated by India, most Pakistan Air Force aircraft grounded in Dhaka due to runway cratering by the Indian Air Force during the liberation war, were sabotaged before surrender. Of these, four Canadair Sabres were also returned to service by Bangladeshi ground technicians in 1972. The Pakistan Air Force prior to 1971 had many Bengali pilots, air traffic controllers, technicians and administrative officers and the general Bengali representation in the Pakistan Air Force was around 15% (and 18% in the officer corps) of the 25,000 odd manpower of the Pakistan Air Force in 1971, which although lower than their share in the population (50%) was much higher than the 6% numbers in the Army. Many of them distinguished themselves during the Bangladesh Liberation War, they provided the nascent Bangladesh Air Force with a good number of trained personnel. It had grown with the repatriation of the around 2000 Air Force personnel from Pakistan in 1973 after the Simla Agreement.

In 1977 some personnel of Bangladesh Air Force, led by Sergeant Afsar, attempted to stage a coup, which resulted in the deaths of 11 air force officers. After the mutiny was put down by the then Provost marshal Wing Commander M. Hamidullah Khan, TJ, SH, BP, President Ziaur Rahman even considered disbanding the Bangladesh Air Force, in favour of an army aviation wing. However, this plan did not go ahead. President Ziaur Rahman placed Hamidullah in charge of Command and Communication Control at the old Parliamentary building, present day Prine Ministers office. Hamidullah reorganized the Forces intelligence to directorate general level under the authority of the President. Hence the DGFI was born.

Defence co-operation improved with Pakistan considerably under the government of Ziaur Rahman and the military regime of Hossain Mohammad Ershad in Bangladesh, which had grown more distant from its war ally, India. Common concerns over India's regional meddling have influenced strategic co-operation leading to a gift of several squadrons of refurbished Shenyang F-6 fighter aircraft from Pakistan to the Bangladesh Air Force in the late 1980s. Bangladesh bought 8 Mig-29 from Russia in 1999 under Prime Minister Sheikh Hasina.
Bangladesh Air Force Academy (BAFA) received National colours in 2003 by the then Prime Minister Khaleda Zia. The Recruits' Training School (RTS) has been awarded with BAF Colours by ex-Chief of Air Staff (AVM Fakhrul Azam) in 2004. In 2017 Bangladesh Air Force was awarded the Independence Day Award.

Covid-19 pandemic operations
Bangladesh Air Force was very active during COVID-19 pandemic . BAF provided emergency Medivac for many critical COVID-19 patients by their helicopters. BAF also evacuated immigrants, migrants workers and airlifted tons of relief materials for home and abroad by their C-130B and C-130J cargo aircraft.

Forces Goal 2030

The Bangladesh Air Force has an ambitious modernisation plan to be implemented in upcoming years under Forces Goal 2030. As per the goal, air force is to be a strong deterrent force to well protect the sky of Bangladesh. Plans are made to strengthen both air power and land based air defence capabilities. Since the formulation of the forces goal 2030, the BAF has developed in many folds.

The Air Force has set up an advanced training unit named 105 Advance Jet Training Unit which is a dedicated fighter pilot training unit of BAF. The unit consists of three training squadrons which will provide advanced training to the pilots selected for operating the fighter jets.

Since 2010, BAF has taken the delivery of sixteen Chengdu F-7BGI fighter aircraft, sixteen Yakovlev Yak-130 advanced jet trainers, two C-130J transport aircraft, nine K-8W jet trainer aircraft, three Let L-410 Turbolet transport trainer aircraft and twenty three CJ-6 basic trainers. Process is going on for the procurement of sixteen multirole combat aircraft.
 
BAF has also taken the delivery of 21 Mi-171Sh combat transport helicopters, four AgustaWestland AW139 maritime SAR helicopters and two AW 119KX training helicopters since 2010. Procurement process of eight attack helicopters is going on.

BAF earned the Surface to Air Missile capability by introducing FM-90 short range air defence missile in 2011. Till date, BAF Has taken the delivery of two regiments of FM-90 systems. Bangladesh air force received an Italian origin long range Selex RAT-31DL air defence radar in 2019.

Bangladesh has signed a government to government contract with the United Kingdom for the supply of two off-the-shelf C-130J aircraft currently in service with the Royal Air Force. In June 2019, another contract was signed for the procurement of additional three off-the-shelf C-130J aircraft from UK. As of September 2020, three of the aircraft have been delivered.

On 20 June 2018, the Bangladesh Air Force signed a contract with China National Aero-Technology Import & Export Corporation (CATIC) for the procurement of seven K-8 jet training aircraft.
On 15 October 2020 BAF received those seven procured K-8 jet training aircraft.

UN mission deployment
More than 600+ BAF personnel, including officers and airmen, 10 BAF helicopters and are currently deployed to various UN Missions. Another C-130 transport aircraft is providing support to UN Mission in Africa. With the deployment of C-130 aircraft and its personnel, Bangladesh became the largest troops contributing country in UN peacekeeping missions.

Women in Bangladesh Air Force

On 25 November 2020, 64 female recruits completed airmens recruit training in Recruits Training School, Shamshernagar; this was the first time that the air force took females as airwomen. As officers, women can join since the early 2000s but women were not allowed to become pilots till 2014, in 2014 two females received pilots training. Now female pilots of BAF have flown Mi-17s, Bell-206s, L-410s and recently C-130Js.

List of the Chiefs of Air Staff

Organisation
According to the Constitution of Bangladesh, President of Bangladesh act as the civilian commander-in-chief, and Chief of Air Staff (COAS), by statute a four-star air officer (air chief marshal), commands the Air Force. The Bangladesh Air Force is currently commanded by Air Chief Marshal Shaikh Abdul Hannan.
The Bangladesh Air Force (BAF) has its headquarters at Dhaka Cantonment. HQ has 4 branches, Operations & Training (Ops. & Trng.), Administration (Admin.), Maintenance (Mte.) and Plannings (Plans). Each branch is headed by officers who are considered as principal staff officer (PSO) and known as assistant chief of air staff, e.g. ACAS (Ops & Trng). Under each PSO there are various directorates headed by directors of air commodore rank. Under each director there are deputy directors (DD) headed by group captain and staff officers (SO) with the rank of wing commander and below.

 Office of the Chief of Air Staff (COAS)
 Air Secretary's Branch
 Chief Inspector's Office
 Directorate of Air Intelligence
 Judge Advocate General

 Operations and Training Branch
 Directorate of Air Defence
 Directorate of Air Operations
 Directorate of Air Traffic Services
 Directorate of Air Training
 Directorate of Education
 Directorate of Flight Safety
 Directorate of Cyber Warfare and Information Technology
 Directorate of Meteorology
 Directorate of Overseas Air Operations

 Administration Branch 
 Directorate of Provost Marshal
 Directorate of Administrative Co-ordination
 Directorate of Finance
 Directorate of Medical Services (Air)
 Directorate of Personnel
 Chief Engineer's Office (Air)
 Directorate of Works
 Directorate of Welfare and Ceremony

 Maintenance Branch
 Directorate of Armament and Weapons
 Directorate of Communication and Electronics
 Directorate of Engineering
 Directorate of Supply

 Planning Branch
 Directorate of Plans
 Directorate of Flight Safety
 Directorate of Recruitment
 Directorate of Project
 Directorate of Administrative Co-ordination

Senior commanders

Branches (officer) 

Branches of officers of Bangladesh Air Force are:
 General Duties (Pilot), abbreviation: GD(P)
 General Duties (Navigator), abbreviation: GD(N)
 Engineering
 Air Defense Weapons Controlling (ADWC)
 Air Traffic control (ATC)
 Meteorology
 Logistics
 Administration
 Finance/Accounts
 Education
 Legal
 Medical (officers are seconded from army)

Trade groups (airmen) 
Trade Groups of airmen are:

Rank structure

Officers

Airmen

Installations and bases

 BAF Base Bashar, Dhaka
 BAF Base Bangabandhu, Dhaka
 BAF Base Zahurul Haque, Chattogram
 BAF Base Matiur Rahman, Jashore
 BAF Base Pahar Kanchanpur, Tangail
 BAF Base Sheikh Hasina, Cox's Bazar
 Bangladesh Air Force Academy, Jashore
 Recruits Training School, Shamshernagar, Moulvibazar
 Moulvibazar Radar Unit, Moulvibazar
 Bogura Radar Unit, Bogura
 Barishal Radar Unit, Barishal
 Airmen Training Institution, Chattogram
 Flying Instructor's School, Bogura

Equipment

Aircraft
See also: List of active Bangladesh military aircraft & List of historic Bangladesh Air Force aircraft

Ordnance

Air defense

Radars

Future modernisation plans
The BAF has an ongoing modernisation programme under Forces Goal 2030. To perform its increasing duties and responsibilities, the air force is being divided into two separate commands: Southern air command and Northern air command. A new air base is being set up under southern command at Barishal with an emphasis on maritime security. Another air base is under construction at Sylhet.

On 29 October 2019, Italian company Leonardo announced that it has secured a contract to supply Kronos Land 3D AESA radar systems to the Bangladesh Air Force to provide air surveillance and detect and track targets in tactical environments. The number of radars ordered were not disclosed.

In the third Bangladesh-UK strategic dialogue held in May 2019, the two countries desired to further strengthen the defence ties between them. The United Kingdom expressed its readiness to support Bangladesh with procurement of high calibre multi-role combat aircraft alongside other modernisation programmes.

In October 2019, US officials said Bangladesh had proposed to the United States to purchase advanced military equipment including multi-role combat fighters, attack helicopters and surface-to-air missile systems. They offered Bangladesh Air Force two types of attack helicopters and the BAF opted for the AH-64 Apache helicopters. In January 2020, Boeing confirmed that the AH-64E attack helicopter has been down-selected by the BAF after a competitive bidding process. Any purchase of AH-64 Apache helicopters depends on Bangladesh and the United States signing Acquisition and Cross-Servicing Agreement (ACSA) and General Security of Military Information Agreement (GSOMIA) agreements. However, in late December 2021, it was reported that Bangladesh is now finalizing a government-to-government (G2G) deal with Russia to buy 8 Mi-28NEs with necessary equipment, along with operation and maintenance training. As of 2023, the Bangladesh government has not signed the deal yet.

In January 2020, the minister responsible for defence affairs in the parliament, Mr. Anisul Huq told the parliament that process is going on to procure 16 multirole combat aircraft, eight attack helicopters, three VVIP helicopters, two air defence radar units, 24 primary trainer aircraft, two light aircraft, one K-8W simulator, four MRAP vehicles, one AW-119 simulator, 2 counter drone surveillance radar system and one mobile ATC tower and life extension and upgrade of Mig-29 aircraft.

In 2021, Bangladesh Air Force requested Bangladesh Government to earmark around 25,200-crores taka  (2.5 billion euro) for 16 western-origin multirole fighter jet. In order to sign the agreement and for the first installment council, Bangladesh Air Force has requested for allocation of 6,300-crores taka from the 2021-22 financial year. In 2021, Eurofighter World Magazine stated Bangladesh as a potential customer for the Eurofighter Typhoon. France also offered the Dassault Rafale to the Bangladesh Air Force. Plans and procedures for the procurement of 16 western-origin multirole fighter jet were established after cancellation of the older tender for 8 to 12 Russian made MRCA. As of 2023, the Bangladesh government has not signed any deal for the multirole fighter jets.

In June 2021, Bangladesh Air Force revealed the order of 24 Grob G 120TP trainer aircraft. According to Masihuzzaman Serniabat, previous COAS, Bangladesh Air Force has ordered 24 trainer aircraft from Grob. Under the deal, Grob Aircraft will also install a composite material (fiberglass reinforced plastic and carbon fibre composites) repair workshop and a propeller repair workshop in Bangladesh.

Accidents
 8 April 2008: Squadron Leader Morshed Hasan died when a Chengdu F-7  crashed in Ghatail upazila of Tangail. The pilot ejected from the aircraft but was critically injured when its parachute malfunctioned. He died at Combined Military Hospital (CMH) in Dhaka after he had been rescued from the scene.
 20 December 2010: Squadron Leaders Ashraf Ibne Ahmed and Mahmudul Haque were killed as Bangladesh Air Force PT-6 aircraft crashed near Barisal Airport.
 8 April 2012: A pilot officer Shariful Haque died and a squadron leader Muhammad Mamunur Rashid was injured when an Aero L-39 training aircraft crashed in Madhupur upazila of Tangail.
26 April 2012: A PT-6 aircraft was on a training mission belonging to Bangladesh Air Force crash landed in West Bengal, India. Trainee pilot Rashed Sheikh's escaped the aircraft safely with minor injuries. India arranged a safe return of the pilot to Bangladesh.
 13 May 2015: A Mi-17 helicopter on a training flight belonging to Bangladesh Air Force crash landed at the airport and caught fire. All three people on board sustained major injuries and were hospitalized. 
 29 June 2015: Flight Lieutenant Tahmid went missing when his F-7MB crashed into the Bay of Bengal. The Aircraft took off around 10:27am from Johurul Haque air base, lost contact with the control room around 11:10am and later crashed in the Bay of Bengal in Patenga around 11:30am.
 11 July 2017: A Yak-130 'Mitten' training aircraft crashed at Lohagara in Bangladesh's southeastern Chittagong District. Two pilots were unharmed.
 27 December 2017: Two Yak-130 aircraft crashed at Maheshkhali Island in Cox's Bazar due to a mid-air collision. The official report states that the accident happened during the breaking of formation at a training exercise. All four pilots of two aircraft were rescued alive.
3 January 2018: 1 Mil Mi-17 helicopter crashed in Sreemangal whilst carrying Kuwaiti delegates. Everyone was rescued alive.
 1 July 2018:  Squadron Leader Md Serajul Islam and Squadron Leader Enayet Kabir Polash were killed when their K-8W trainer aircraft crashed at Bookbhora oxbow lake near Jessore Airport on a night training mission.
  23 November 2018: Wing Commander Arif Ahmed Dipu died when his F-7BG crashed in Tangail's Madhupur upazila on a training mission. The fuel tank of the aircraft reportedly caught fire after it used weaponry in the sky, leading the pilot to eject in low altitude. The pilot was later found dead and parts of plane were seen scattered.

See also

 Bangabandhu Aeronautical Centre
List of historic Bangladesh military aircraft
 Bangladesh Air Force Academy
 Bangladesh Army
 Bangladesh National Cadet Corps
 Bangladesh Navy

References

External links
 Official Website of Bangladesh Air Force
 Bangladesh Air Force Order of Battle, Scramble magazine
 Bangladesh National Cadet Corps (BNCC)

 
Military units and formations established in 1971
Military of Bangladesh
Recipients of the Independence Day Award
Uniformed services of Bangladesh